Phone is the eleventh novel by Will Self, published in 2017. It concludes a "modernist" trilogy also consisting of Umbrella and Shark.

Content
The stream-of-consciousness novel continues the story of psychiatrist Zack Busner.

Reviews
Writing for The Sunday Herald, Todd McEwan wrote: "You begin to realise that this is not art, and it’s not even satire. It’s just stuff that oozes out of a writer who is floundering in the tar pit of the establishment. Jon Day, writing for The Guardian, noted: "Phone isn’t an attempt to inhabit the language of modernism but an attempt to exhaust a style. There’s still plenty of fun to be had spotting references to Self’s lodestars...It’ll take you a couple of weeks to read all three novels properly. But I can’t think of a better way to spend your time."

References

External links
Official Will Self site

2017 British novels
Novels by Will Self
Postmodern novels
Viking Press books